Fagamalo is a village in American Samoa. It is located on the north shore of Tutuila Island. The village was long only reachable by narrow trails over rugged vertical terrain. The trails were often obscured by brush and seldom traveled because they traversed the thick rain forests. It often required hours of hiking before reaching the village. Route 1 now climbs steeply and winds up to the village of Fagamalo, where the road ends. It is located in Lealataua County in the Western District of Tutuila Island.

The coastline between Fagamalo and Fagasā Bay is a rugged and scenic stretch of shoreline which contains the coastal villages of A'asu and Fagasā. This stretch also contains Sita Bay, a cove which has been home to large colonies of flying foxes. Massacre Bay is where a battle between French sailors and Samoans happened in 1787. Pā Cove is near the village of Fagamalo and is the site of a prehistoric village. It has been noted in Samoan legends.

In 1987, researchers from University of Oregon discovered the site of the legendary village of Ā on a ridge above Fagamalo. Initial tests showed that the site was occupied in 600 BCE, which makes it the oldest known village on the island. The village mayor of Fagamalo was charged with attempted murder in 2005. He was held on a $50,000 bail after allegedly jeopardizing the lives of two fishermen. In 2010, Fagamalo was the first village in American Samoa to create a designated protected marine area.

Demographics

See also
Fagamalo Village Marine Protected Area
A'a Village Site

References

Villages in American Samoa